The eighteenth series of the British medical drama television series Casualty began airing on BBC One in the United Kingdom on 13 September 2003, and concluded on 28 August 2004. The series consists of 46 episodes, which focus on the professional and personal lives of medical and ancillary staff at the emergency department (ED) of the fictional Holby City Hospital. Foz Allen serves as the series producer, while Mal Young and Mervyn Watson act as the executive producers of the series. Twelve regular cast members reprised their roles from the previous series and six actors joined the cast during the series. Original cast member Julia Watson, who portrays Baz Wilder, also returned.

The series begins with a two-part episode airing over consecutive days, and features a double train crash. The stunt was filmed at Nene Valley Railway over 24 days and involved two production teams and 1470 supporting artists. A story was also created to raise money for 24th Children in Need telethon, in November 2003, and features a cameo appearance from Lord Lichfield. Series 18 of Casualty marks the show becoming the longest running television medical drama series in the world. The serial was nominated for Best Continuing Drama at the 2004 British Academy Television Awards during the series. In a 2011 poll run by the show's website, to celebrate its twenty-fifth anniversary, the opening episode of the series was voted the best ever episode.

Production 
The series commences in the United Kingdom on 13 September 2003 on BBC One with a two-part episode airing over consecutive days. Foz Allen serves as the series producer, while Mal Young and Mervyn Watson act as the executive producers of the series. Young, who is also the BBC Controller of Drama, commented, "Series 18 will hopefully keep surprising and gripping our audience." The series films in Bristol and marks Casualty becoming the longest running television medical drama series in the world. The opening episodes, billed as the show's "most ambitious yet", feature a double train crash. The stunt took two production teams working to film over 24 days and featured 1470 supporting artists. The episode were filmed on-location in the Nene Valley Railway in Peterborough. Actors Kwame Kwei-Armah and Ian Bleasdale, who portray paramedics Finlay Newton and Josh Griffiths respectively, enjoyed filming the stunt. Kwei-Armah compared it to the making of a "big movie". Writers created a story to raise money for the 24th Children in Need telethon, in November 2003. Featuring a cameo appearance from Lord Lichfield, the story sees staff create a charity calendar, which was later sold commercially to raise money for Children in Need.

Cast 
The eighteenth series of Casualty features a cast of characters working for the NHS within the emergency department of Holby City Hospital and the Holby Ambulance Service. Twelve cast members from the previous series reprise their roles in this series. Original cast member Derek Thompson continues his role as Charlie Fairhead, a clinical nurse specialist. Having joined in the fourth series, Ian Bleasdale stars as Josh Griffiths, the operational duty manager at Holby Ambulance Service. Simon MacCorkindale plays Harry Harper, a consultant in emergency medicine and the department's clinical director. Christine Stephen-Daly portrays Lara Stone, an acting registrar, and Christopher Colquhoun appears as registrar Simon Kaminski. Loo Brealey and Zita Sattar feature as Roxy Bird and Anna Paul, both staff nurses. Kwame Kwei-Armah, Martina Laird and Matthew Wait play paramedics Finlay Newton, Comfort Jones and Luke Warren, respectively. Kelly Harrison portrays Nikki Marshall, an ambulance technician, and Sarah Manners appears as Bex Reynolds, a receptionist.

Actress Suzanne Packer joined the cast in episode one as Tess Bateman, an emergency nurse practitioner. She is billed as "a traditionalist [who] is keen to maintain the standards she was taught at nursing college". The character and Packer's casting details were announced on 24 April 2003. Tess' introduction reflected the rise in nurse practitioners being hired in NHS hospitals. For the role, Packer relocated from New York City to Cardiff, where her family are based. Louis Emerick was cast in a recurring role as Tess' fireman husband Mike Bateman. His casting was announced on 17 June 2003 and he was initially hired for four episodes. The pair previously portrayed a married couple on Brookside, and also worked together in the play Playboy of the West Indies in 1985. The actors were excited to work with each other again and Packer felt their history aided their on-screen connection. Maxwell Caulfield was cast as Jim Brodie, a consultant paediatrician. He is characterised as a womaniser with an "air of transatlantic glamour and smooth maturity". James Redmond also joined the show as Abs Denham, a mental health nurse who is billed as charming yet "a bit of an oddball". Redmond explained that Abs is "fascinated" by people with mental health issues and wants to "champion mental health", becoming frustrated by its stigma. He added that Abs is unafraid of the hierarchy and will challenge anybody else's views. Redmond relocated to his hometown of Bristol for the role, but found moving into his family home challenging.

Leanne Wilson was introduced as staff nurse Claire Guildford, who was described as "gentle, happy glow as dependable and down-to-earth". Wilson explained that Claire is strong, confident in her decisions and excited about her work. The character quickly features in a story about the end of her relationship with Keith, her boyfriend of six years. Keith is not ready to end the relationship and becomes scary, not accepting her decision. The character of Tally Harper was reintroduced to the main cast, with the role recast to actress Holly Davidson. Tally is the "troublesome" eldest daughter of Harry, who the actress called "feisty and independent". Tally cares for her younger siblings, following the recent death of their mother. Davidson explained that Tally resents her father for not coping with her death well. The actress drew on her own parents' divorce to play the death of Tally's mother. One story for the character sees her become romantically involved with Simon, against the wishes of Harry. The series also features the return of original character Baz Wilder, portrayed by Julia Watson. The character was killed off after eight episodes.

The series features several recurring characters and multiple guest stars. Only Fools and Horses actress Gwyneth Strong was cast as Elizabeth, the former wife of Jim. It was confirmed in July 2003 that Charles Dale, Helen Fraser, Frank Windsor and Tracy Shaw would guest star in the series. Fraser portrays Joan, the mother of Claire's boyfriend, Keith. Wilson explained that Joan does not want to lose Claire as she sees her as a daughter.

Main characters 

Ian Bleasdale as Josh Griffiths
Louise Brealey as Roxy Bird
Maxwell Caulfield as Jim Brodie (from episode 2)

Holly Davidson as Tally Harper (episodes 3−34)
Rebekah Gibbs as Nina Farr (from episode 41)
Kelly Harrison as Nikki Marshall (until episode 40)
Kwame Kwei-Armah as Fin Newton
Martina Laird as Comfort Jones
Simon MacCorkindale as Harry Harper
Sarah Manners as Bex Reynolds
Suzanne Packer as Tess Bateman (from episode 1)
James Redmond as John "Abs" Denham (from episode 5)
Zita Sattar as Anna Paul (until episode 3)
Christine Stephen-Daly as Lara Stone (until episode 46)
Derek Thompson as Charlie Fairhead (until episode 40)
Matthew Wait as Luke Warren
Leanne Wilson as Claire Guildford (from episode 3)

Recurring characters 

Rebecca Blake as Julie Hughes (episodes 11−34)
Tim Dantay as Adam Hughes (episodes 11−32)
Louis Emerick as Mike Bateman (episodes 1−11 and 24)
Sebastian Dunn as Merlin Jameson (episodes 2−3)
Helen Fraser as Joan Jowell (episodes 5−9)
Natalie Glover as Emma Newton (episode 40)
Ashley Jensen as Stella Richards (episode 45−46)
Victor McGuire as Father Frank (episodes 2−6)
Cassie Raine as Kate Millar (episodes 31 and 39)

Kemal Sylvester as PC Robert Sagar (episodes 31−38)

Guest characters 

Peter Ash as Keith Jowell (episodes 3−9)
Romy Baskerville as Dr. Hilary Gilmore (episodes 3 and 11)
Tracie Bennett as Gina Driscoll (episodes 31–32)
Emma Charleston as Nicole Bird (episode 31)
Clare Clifford as Pauline Harvey (episodes 36−37)
Archie Farrow as Baby William (episodes 31 and 34)
Liam Hess as Louis Fairhead (episodes 12−25)
Julia Hills as Caroline Miller (episodes 40−42)
Patrick Lichfield as himself (episode 9)
John Joseph as Terry Hollingsworth (episode 27)
Lisa Pavitt as Lucy Brodie (episodes 13 and 18)
Tim Plester as Derek Moberley (episode 10)
Nicholas Tizzard as Policeman/McCormack (episode 9)
Julia Watson as Baz Wilder (episodes 12−19)
Kristian Wilkin as Andy Brodie (episodes 8−22)
Frank Windsor as Kenneth Samuels (episodes 12−25)
Nigel Whitmey as Dan Wilder (episodes 12−25)
Susannah York as Helen Grant (episodes 35−36)

Reception 
During series eighteen, Casualty was nominated for Best Continuing Drama at the 2004 British Academy Television Awards. The opening episode was rated the best ever episode in an online poll ran by the show's website for its twenty-fifth anniversary in September 2011. On a shortlist of ten episodes, it received 18.5% of total votes.

Episodes

Documentaries

References

External links
 Casualty series 18 at the Internet Movie Database

18
2003 British television seasons
2004 British television seasons